The 2016–17 Australian Baseball League season was the seventh Australian Baseball League (ABL) season, and was held from 17 November 2016 to 11 February 2017.

Teams

Regular season

Standings

Statistical leaders

Postseason

Bracket

Preliminary Final Series

Game 1

Game 2

Game 3

Composite Line Score
2017 ABL Preliminary Final Series (2–1): Brisbane Bandits over Adelaide Bite

Championship Series

Game 1

Game 2

Composite Line Score
2017 ABL Championship Series (2–0): Brisbane Bandits over Melbourne Aces

References

External links 
The Australian Baseball League – Official ABL Website
Official Baseball Australia Website

 
Australian Baseball League seasons
Australian Baseball League
Australian Baseball League